Oxystelma is a genus of flowering plants of the family Apocynaceae, first described as a genus in 1810. It is native to Africa and Asia.

Species
The Plant List includes:
 Oxystelma bornouense R.Br. - tropical Africa
 Oxystelma esculentum (L.f.) Sm. - China (Guangdong, Guangxi, Yunnan), Indochina, Indian Subcontinent (India, Sri Lanka, Bangladesh, Nepal, Pakistan), Middle East, NE Africa

Species that were formerly included
The following species have been moved to other genera (Ischnostemma, Philibertia, Telosma, and [[Cynanchum):

References

Apocynaceae genera
Asclepiadoideae